The 1967 Magyar Kupa (English: Hungarian Cup) was the 28th season of Hungary's annual knock-out cup football competition.

Final

See also
 1967 Nemzeti Bajnokság I

References

External links
 Official site 
 soccerway.com

1967–68 in Hungarian football
1967–68 domestic association football cups
1967